Platagarista is a monotypic moth genus of the family Noctuidae erected by Karl Jordan in 1912. Its only species, Platagarista macleayi, or Macleay's day-moth, was first described by William Sharp Macleay in 1864. It is found in the Australian states of Queensland and New South Wales.

References

Agaristinae
Monotypic moth genera